The Law in Her Hands is a 1936 American drama film directed by William Clemens and written by George Bricker and Luci Ward. The film stars Margaret Lindsay and Glenda Farrell. It was released by Warner Bros. on May 16, 1936. The film's working title was "Lawyer Woman". Mary and Dorothy open their own law practice, but after months of rising debt and falling income, they start representing members of the organized crime.

Plot
Two waitresses working in New York, Mary Wentworth (Margaret Lindsay) and Dorothy Davis (Glenda Farrell), pass their bar exam and become lawyers. When their employer Franz (Al Shean) takes a photo of the two women, he accidentally photographs a gangster in the background, just before the gangster throws a smoke bomb in the restaurant. This was an effort to intimidate Franz into joining the protection racket run by Frank Gordon (Lyle Talbot). The perpetrator is arrested and the case is prosecuted by Robert Mitchell (Warren Hull), who is Mary's boyfriend. At the trial, Gordon finds people to testify that the accused was not at the restaurant, but Mary and Dorothy show the photograph taken in the restaurant. Gordon is actually impressed by Mary and offers her a job as his lawyer, but she turns him down. This has also impressed Robert, but he still believes that the law is no profession for a woman, and asks her to quit and marry him instead.

When a lawyer plants a bottle of liquor in a coat Mary has entered into evidence, she loses her first case in court. Hoping to discourage Mary, Robert suggests that she represent a man who has already signed a confession. Later, Mary decides to use the same trick and beats Robert in court. She also decides to take Gordon as a client and acquires a big reputation. When Mary learns that Gordon was responsible for the deaths of several people, she changes her mind and refuses to represent him anymore. However, Gordon forces her into defending him, and in court she deliberately gets herself disbarred from the case. No longer his lawyer, she accuses Gordon of the murders, allowing Robert to win the case and convict Gordon. Later, Mary marries Robert and decides to give up her law career.

Cast       
 
 Margaret Lindsay as Mary Wentworth
 Glenda Farrell as Dorothy 'Dot' Davis
 Warren Hull as Asst. Dist. Atty. Robert Mitchell
 Lyle Talbot as Frank 'Legs' Gordon
 Eddie Acuff as Eddie O'Malley
 Dick Purcell as Marty
 Al Shean as Franz
 Addison Richards as William McGuire
 Joseph Crehan as Dist. Atty. Thomas Mallon

Reception
The New York Times movie review said: "Miss Margaret Lindsay is a beautiful young lady from Dubuque, Iowa, and, out of pure chivalry, we would have her protected from such amiable mediocrities as "The Law in Her Hands," which now occupies the screen at the Palace. Neither she nor the many other members of the Warner-First National stock company employed in the film can give substance to a narrative which, despite any amount of ingenious fabrication, could hardly aspire to be more than a congenial triviality."

References

External links
 
 
 
 

1936 films
Warner Bros. films
American drama films
1936 drama films
Films directed by William Clemens
American black-and-white films
Films about lawyers
1930s English-language films
1930s American films